Danmarks plass is a square in Årstad borough in the city of Bergen, Norway. Today most famous as one of Norway's busiest road intersections, it was originally known as "Kronstadtorget". After World War II, it received its current name in honour of Denmark's humanitarian efforts in Norway during the war. "Danmarks plass" is commonly used also to describe the immediate surroundings of the square, e.g. Krohnsminde kunstgressbane. Danmarks plass has more air pollution than anywhere else in Bergen, caused by the traffic as well as its location between two hills.

On an average, more than 60,000 vehicles pass through the at-grade intersection at Danmarksplass every day. European route E39, the main road into Bergen from both the south and the north, runs through Danmarksplass. Located near the city centre, Danmarksplass is a major thoroughfare for the tens of thousands of people who daily commute to work in the city centre or other boroughs.

The Bergen Light Rail line passes through Danmarksplass. The construction of the light rail line and stations, which was started in early 2008, lead to the closure of several lanes. Ibsens gate, the eastern arm of the intersection, was closed in August the same year.

References

Squares in Bergen